The Electronic Journal of Theoretical Physics is a quarterly peer-reviewed open access scientific journal that was established in 2003. It covers all aspects of theoretical physics. The editors-in-chief are Ammar Sakaji (International Institute for Theoretical Physics and Mathematics, Prato, Italy) and Ignazio Licata (Institute for Scientific Methodology, Palermo, Italy) and the printed version is published by Aracne Editrice. The journal is abstracted and indexed in Scopus.

Majorana Prize 

The journal annually awards the Majorana Prize, also known as the Majorana Medal, to recognize outstanding contributions to theoretical and mathematical physics. The prize is named for Italian physicist Ettore Majorana (1906–1938), a pioneer in neutrino physics and the quantum mechanics of spin. It is awarded in three categories:

 The Best Person in Physics
 The Best EJTP Special Issue Paper
 The Best EJTP Paper

References

External links
 
 Majorana Prize website

Physics journals
Open access journals
Quarterly journals
Publications established in 2003
English-language journals
Online-only journals